Lasha Totadze (born 24 August 1988) is a Georgian football player who plays for Gareji as a centre-back.

Career 
The central defender began his career with FC Gagra Tbilisi and joined than in January 2008 to FC Dynamo-2 Kyiv.

On 27 February 2021, Aktobe announced the signing of Totadze. On 23 June 2021, Aktobe announced that Totadze left the club by mutual consent.

In early 2022 he signed a contract with Gareji Sagarejo.

Style of play 
Lasha Totadze is a central defender, but he can also play as a left-back. He is also known for his ability to score from free kicks from long distances.

Honours
 Dinamo Tbilisi
Georgian League: 2013–14
Georgian Cup: 2013–14
Super Cup: 2014

 Dila Gori
Georgian League: Runner-up 2012–13
Georgian Cup: 2011–12
Super Cup: Runner-up 2014

References

External links

UEFA Profile
FC Dinamo Tbilisi official Profile
Profile 

1988 births
Living people
People from Akhaltsikhe
Footballers from Abkhazia
Expatriate footballers from Georgia (country)
Footballers from Georgia (country)
Association football defenders
FC Gagra players
FC Dynamo Kyiv players
Győri ETO FC players
Lombard-Pápa TFC footballers
FC Dila Gori players
FC Sioni Bolnisi players
FC Dinamo Tbilisi players
FC Saburtalo Tbilisi players
FC Qizilqum Zarafshon players
FC Samtredia players
FC Aktobe players
Nassaji Mazandaran players
Nemzeti Bajnokság I players
Erovnuli Liga players
Kazakhstan Premier League players
Expatriate footballers in Ukraine
Expatriate footballers in Hungary
Expatriate footballers in Iran
Expatriate footballers in Uzbekistan
Expatriate footballers in Kazakhstan
Expatriate sportspeople from Georgia (country) in Ukraine
Expatriate sportspeople from Georgia (country) in Hungary
Expatriate sportspeople from Georgia (country) in Iran
Expatriate sportspeople from Georgia (country) in Uzbekistan
Expatriate sportspeople from Georgia (country) in Kazakhstan
Georgia (country) youth international footballers